Sattyg is the twelfth full-length album by progressive rock band Kaipa.

Track listing
 "A Map of Your Secret World" - 15:02
 "World of the Void" - 7:49
 "Screwed-Upness" - 13:06
 "Sattyg" - 3:13
 "A Sky Full of Painters" - 14:42
 "Unique When We Fall" - 5:17
 "Without Time - Beyond Time" - 9:49

Personnel
 Patrik Lundström - vocals
 Aleena Gibson - vocals
 Per Nilsson - electric and acoustic guitars
 Morgan Ågren - drums
 Hans Lundin - keyboards and vocals
 Jonas Reingold - electric basses
 Fredrik Lindqvist - recorders and whistles (tracks 1, 3, 4, & 6)
 Elin Rubinsztein - violin (tracks 3, 4, & 5)

2014 albums
Kaipa albums